The Huainan biota is a collection of macroscopic skeletal organisms discovered in the early 1980s by Wang and Sun Weiguo in the Precambrian deposits of China (Huainan City, Anhui Province) with an age of 840-740 Ma (Tonian). A similar biota was also found by M. B. Gnilovskaya in Russia, on the Timan Ridge; its age is about 1 billion years.

So far, it has been poorly studied. It is only known that its constituent organisms (Protoarenicola, Pararenicola, Sinosabellidites) reached several centimeters in size (which is significantly inferior to the Ediacaran ones) and, apparently, had the shape of segmented tubes, often goblet-shaped, with extensions at the end. Assumptions have been made about both the animal (worm-like) and algal nature of these organisms.

Huainan biota do not contain jellyfish-like "discs" (as does the Ediacaran biota), nor any forms close to sponges (the most primitive of modern animal groups, with the exception of Trichoplax); apparently, the Huainan biota cannot be considered ancestral either to the Ediacaran, or even more so to the modern (Phanerozoic).

See also 
 Otavia

References 

 Sun Weiguo, Wang Guixiang, Zhou Benhe. Macroscopic worm-like body fossils from the Upper Precambrian (900—700 Ma), Huainan district, Anhui, China and their stratigraphic and evolutionary significance // Precambrian Research. — 1986. — Vol. 31, No. 4. — P. 377–403. — doi:10.1016/0301-9268(86)90041-0.
 Leiming Yin, Weiguo Sun. Microbiota from the Neoproterozoic Liulaobei Formation in the Huainan region, northern Anhui, China. // Precambrian Research. - Volume 65, Issues 1–4, January 1994, Pages 95–114.

Proterozoic animals
Neoproterozoic
Proterozoic Eonothem of Asia
Ediacaran Asia
Fossiliferous stratigraphic units of Asia
Paleontology in Anhui
Geography of Anhui
Tonian life
Prehistoric biotas